Geologic mapping of Georgia is the creation of geologic maps, special-purpose maps made to show geological features, of the State of Georgia in the United States. Rock units or geologic strata are shown by colors or symbols to indicate where they are exposed at the surface. Structural features such as faults and shear zones are also shown. Since the first national geological map, in 1809, there have been numerous maps which included the geology of Georgia. The first Georgia-specific geologic map was created in 1825. The most recent state-produced geologic map of Georgia, by the Georgia Department of Natural Resources is 1:500,000 scale, and was created in 1976 by the department's Georgia Geological Survey. It was generated from a base map produced by the United States Geological Survey. The state geologist and Director of the Geological Survey of Georgia was Sam M. Pickering, Jr. Since 1976, several geological maps of Georgia, featuring the state's five distinct geologic regions, have been produced by the federal government.

History of geologic mapping in Georgia

Previous statewide geologic maps of Georgia
The first statewide geologic map of Georgia was published in 1825.  It was a 1:1,000,000 scale map of Georgia and Alabama published by Henry Schenck Tanner. In 1849 W.T. Williams published the geological features for the state on a 1:120,000 scale map within George White's (1849) Statistics of the State of Georgia report. Then in 1871, Dr. Matthew Fleming Stephenson published a 1:1,200,000 scale map of the Geology and mineralogy of Georgia through the Globe Publishing Company of Atlanta. This map was part of a report with the same name. Another statewide map of the geology of Georgia was published in 1876 by G. Little in the Handbook of the State of Georgia by T.P. Janes. In 1885 Georgia Commissioner of Agriculture J.T. Henderson produced a 1:2,500,000 scale map of the geology of Georgia.  In 1895 R. T. Nesbitt produced a small-scale geological map of Georgia that was included in a statistical review of the state.  The review was described as a Chamber of commerce styled work, that presented the economic mineral resources and geology of the state in a promotional and exaggerated manner. This was the last statewide geological map published in the 19th Century.

Within the 20th Century there were three statewide geological maps produced prior to the 1976 map.  The first was a 1-inch to 15 mile map produced by S.W. McCallie in 1908. In 1939, George Willis Stose et al. produced a 1:500,000 scale map that was published by the Georgia Geologic Survey and the United States Geological Survey. This map was reprinted in 1960 by the U.S. Geological Survey.  The third map was published in 1968 by the Geological Survey of Georgia.  This map was produced by J.W. Smith and M.S. Green, a 1:2,500,000 scale map.

Geologic maps that contained the geology of Georgia

From the beginning of the United States, Georgia geology has been included in maps produced for the entire country. The first geological map of the U.S. was produced in 1809 by William Maclure. In 1807, Maclure undertook the self-imposed task of making a geological survey of the United States. He traversed and mapped nearly every state in the Union. During the rigorous two-year period of his survey, he crossed and recrossed the Allegheny Mountains some 50 times. The results of his unaided endeavor were submitted to the American Philosophical Society in a memoir entitled Observations on the Geology of the United States explanatory of a Geological Map, together with the nation's first geological map, which were published in the Society's journal Transactions, This precedes William Smith's geological map of England by six years, although Smith's map was constructed using a different classification of rocks. Several reports used Maclure's geological map to accompany their description of the geology of the U.S. (Beaujour, 1814 and Marcou, 1858). In 1816, within an elementary treatise of mineralogy and geology, Parker Cleaveland produced a geological map of the U.S. In 1843, Charles Moxon produced a small-scale geologic map of the U.S., where Ami Boué produced a geological structure map of the globe. In 1853, Marcou produced a geological map of the U.S. and the British provinces of North America. In 1856, Henry Darwin Rogers created a similar map of the geology of the U.S. and British North America. There was a short description of the geologic map of the U.S. by Charles Henry Hitchcock in 1872, which had small-scale geological maps included. Hitchcock and William P. Blake published a general geologic map of the U.S. in R.W. Raymond's Statistics of mines and mining. In 1874, they published a geological map of the U.S. and territories in the U.S. Census 9th Statistical Atlas. Hitchcock and Blake published a summary of this map in the Geological Magazine in 1873. Gray's geological map of the U.S. was published in the National Atlas special edition at a scale of about 1 inch to 300 miles in 1876 and reprinted in 1886 by the American Institute of Mining Engineers. A geological map of the U.S. east of the Rocky Mountains was produced at the scale of 1 inch to 105.5 miles by Frank H. Bradley. In the 1880s several geological maps of the U.S. were produced. William John McGee offered a detailed description for the U.S. Geological Survey in 1884. In 1887, Hitchcock produced a geological map of the U.S. and parts of Canada that was at the scale of 1 inch to 200 miles, with a review of the various maps of the U.S. that accompanied the geological map of the U.S. In 1895, McGee and J.B. Tolbert produced a 1:15,000,000 scale map of the geology of the U.S.

There have been a host of geological maps of the U.S. produced in the 20th century. Bailey Willis produced a geological map of the U.S. in 1906. George W. Stose produced a 1:2,500,000 scale map in 1932, and a 1:500,000 scale map together with R.W. Smith in 1939. A.K. Lobeck produced a Geologic map of the United States (with text on the reverse side) in 1941 Those are just a few that have been produced. The most recent map being produced is the National Map that is a cooperative project.

The 1976 map
The current geologic map of Georgia was produced in 1976. It was put together mainly in two parts from two teams representing the northern and southern portion of the state.

The map of Georgia is actually a compilation of numerous geological studies and mapping projects that occurred throughout the state and over an extended time period. The major studies that are cited for contribution to the state geologic map fall under three main categories: New mapping by the Georgia Geological Survey, new mapping by the Georgia Geological Survey combined with revised published maps, and published maps with compilation revision only. The majority of the rock units shown on the 1976 map were mapped in 1973 by reconnaissance methods. For some areas, previous authors provided more detailed work than the reconnaissance conducted by the geological survey staff. In those areas, the original author's work was used in compiling the state map.

Recent geologic mapping in the state of Georgia

More recently, geologic mapping has been undertaken by the Georgia Geological Survey through the STATEMAP project. This project was funded from the National Geologic Mapping Act of 1992. This federal act was for the purpose of producing geologic maps that for 2 decades had been drastically curtailed.  It was recognized that "geologic maps are the primary data base for virtually all applied and basic earth-science applications". This act provided 50% of the funds needed, whereas each state that wanted to participate supplied the other 50% of the funding to complete these various mapping projects. Ultimately this project was to be a part of the National Map and the subsequent databases generated by the various state and national mapping projects.

The geology of Georgia
The geology of Georgia consists of five distinct geologic regions, beginning in the northwest corner of the state and moving through the state to the southeast: the Ridge and Valley region also known as the Appalachian Plateau, the Blue Ridge, the Piedmont, the Fall Line  and the Coastal Plain.

See also
Geology of Georgia (U.S. state)
Georgia Department of Natural Resources

References

Further reading
Bayley, W.S., 1928, Geology of the Tate Quadrangle, Georgia, Georgia Geological Survey Bulletin 43, 170 p.
Beaujour, Louis Félix Auguste, 1814, Aperçu des États-Unis, au commencement du XIXe siècle, depuis 1800 jusqu'en 1810, avec des tables statistiques (1 volume, 1814), Paris, Delaunay Libraire, 272 p.
Boué, A., 1843, Carte geologique de globe terrestre, Memoire a l'appui d'une essai de carte geologique du globe terestre, Societe geologique de France Bulletin 2d series 1:296-371.
Bradley, F.H., 1875, Geological chart of the United States east of the rocky Mountains, Punderson and Crisand, New Haven, discussion, American Journal of Science 3rd series, 12:286-291.
Clarke, J.W., 1952, Geology and mineral resources of the Thomaston quadrangle, Georgia, Georgia Geological Survey Bulletin 59, 99p.
Cleaveland, P, 1816, An elementary treatise on mineralogy and geology, 2 vols., Cummings and Hilliard, Boston, 668 p.
Crawford, T. J, 1971, Geologic map Carroll-Heard Counties, Georgia,  in Hurst, V.J. and Long, S.W., Geochemical study of alluvium in the Chattahoochee-Flint area, Georgia, University of Georgia Institute of Community and area development, 52 p.
Crawford, T.J., and Medlin, J.H., 1973, The western Georgia Piedmont between the Cartersville and Brevard fault zones, American Journal of Science, 273:712-722.
Croft, M.G, 1964, Geology and ground water resources of Dade County, Georgia, Georgia Geological Survey Information Circular 26, 17 p.
Cressler, C.W., 1963, Geology and ground water resources of Catoosa County, Georgia, Georgia Geological Survey Information Circular 28, 19 p.
Cressler, C.W.,  1964a, Geology and ground water resources of the Paleozoic rock area, Chattooga County,  Georgia, Georgia Geological Survey Information Circular 27, 14 p.
Cressler, C.W.,  1964b, Geology and ground water resources of Walker County, Georgia,  Georgia, Georgia Geological Survey Information Circular 29, 15 p.
Cressler, C.W., 1970, Geology and ground water resources of Floyd and Polk Counties, Georgia,  Georgia, Georgia Geological Survey Information Circular 39, 95 p.
Cressler, C.W., 1974, Geology and ground-water resources of Gordon, Whitfield, and Murray counties, Georgia, Georgia Geological Survey Information Circular 47, 56 p.
Eargle, D.H., 1955, Stratigraphy of the outcropping Cretaceous Rocks of Georgia, U.S. Geological Survey Bulletin 1014, 101 p.
Fairley, W.M., 1965, The Murphy syncline in the Tate quadrangle, Georgia, Georgia Geological Survey Bulletin 75, 71 p.
Fortson, C.W., Jr., 1959, Reconnaissance geologic map of Hancock County, Georgia, Georgia Institute of Technology Engineering Experiment Station Project A-436-a, 16 p.
Grant, W.H., 1958, The geology of Hart County, Georgia, Georgia Geological Survey Bulletin 67, 75 p.
Hartley, M.E., 1972, Ultramafic and related rocks in the vicinity of Lake Chatuge, Towns County, Georgia and Clay County, North Carolina, Georgia Geological Survey Bulletin 85, 61 p.
Hatcher, R.D., Jr., 1971, The geology of Rabun and Habersham counties, Georgia, Georgia Geological Survey Bulletin 83, 48 p.
Hatcher, R.D., Jr., 1974, An introduction to the Blue ridge tectonic history of northeast Georgia, Georgia Geological Society Guidebook 13A, 60 p.
Herrmann, L.A., 1954, Geology of the Stone Mountain-Lithonia district, Georgia Geological Survey Bulletin 61, 139 p.
Hewitt, D.F., and Crickmay, G.W., 1937, The Warm Springs of Georgia, their relations and origins, a summary report, U.S. Geological Survey WSP 819, 40 p.
Higgins, M.W., 1966, The geology of the Brevard lineament near Atlanta, Georgia Geological Survey Bulletin 77, 49 p.
Hitchcock, C.H., 1872, Description of the geologic map, U.S. Census 9th, vol. 3, pp. 754–756.
Hitchcock, C.H., and Blake, W.P., 1873, Summary of the Geological Map of the U.S., Geological Magazine, 10:371-373.
Hitchcock, C.H., and Blake, W.P., 1874, Geological map of the U.S. and territories, U.S. Census 9th, Statistical Atlas, pp. 6–9.
Hitchcock, C.H., and Blake, W.P., 1874, General geological map of the U.S. IN Raymond, R.W, Statistics of mines and mining in the U.S., 5th Annual Report, pp. 480–484.
Hitchcock, C.H., 1876, Gray's geological map of the U.S., The National Atlas, special edition, pp. 204–205.
Hitchcock, C.H., 1886, Geological map of the United States and part of Canada, American Institute of Mining Engineering.
Hitchcock, C.H., 1887, The geological map of the United States, American Institute of Mining Engineering Transaction 15:465-488.
Hoyt, J., and Hails, J.R., 1967, Pleistocene shoreline sediments in coastal Georgia: Deposition and modifications, Science 155(3769):1541–1543.
Hurst, V.J., 1955, Stratigraphy, structure, and mineral resources of the Mineral Bluff quadrangle, Georgia, Georgia Geological Survey Bulletin 63, 137 p.
Hurst, V.J., 1959, Geologic map of Kennesaw Mountain-Sweat Mountain area, Cobb County, Georgia, Georgia Geological Survey Map.
Hurst, V.J., and Crawford, T.J., 1970, Sulfide deposits in the Coosa Valley area, Georgia, U.S. Dept. of Commerce, Technical Assistance project, 190 p.
Hurst, V.J., Crawford, T.J, and Sandy, J., 1966, Mineral resources of the central Savannah River area, University of Georgia Geology Department CSRA Planning and Development Commission, Georgia Department of Industry & Trade and U.S. Department of Commerce.
Hurst, V. J., and Otwell, W.L., 1964, Exploration for mineral deposits in White County, Georgia, U.S. Dept. of Commerce, Area Redevelopment Administration, Washington D.C., 166 p.
Hurst, V.J., and Schlee, J.S., 1962, Oconee metasediments, north-central Georgia – southeast Tennessee, Guidebook No. 3, SE Section Geological Society of America, 28 p.
Keith, A., in Jones, S.P., 1909, Second report on the gold deposits of Georgia, Georgia Geological Survey Bulletin 19, 283 p.
Kesler, T.L., 1950, Geology and mineral deposits of the Cartersville district, Georgia, U.S. Geological Survey Professional Paper 224, 97 p.
King, J.A., 1957, Guides to southeastern geology, Geological Society of America Appalachian Trip 1:633, 600.
LaForge, L., and Phalen, W.C., 1913, Description of the Ellijay quadrangle, U.S. Geological Survey Geological Atlas of the United States Folio 187, 18 p.
LaMoreaux, P.E., 1946, Geology and ground water resources of the Coastal Plain of east-central Georgia, Georgia Geological Survey Bulletin 52, 173 p.
LaMoreaux, P.E., 1946, Geology of the Coastal Plain of east-central Georgia, Georgia Geological Survey Bulletin 50, 26 p.
Lawton and Pierce, 1972, Geologic and Mineral resource map index of Georgia, Geological Survey of Georgia Information Circular 44, 46 p.
Lester, J.G., and Allen, A.T., Jr., 1950, Diabase of the Georgia Piedmont, Geological Society of America Bulletin 61, pp. 1217–1224.
Little, G, 1876, Geological Survey of the state in Janes, T.P., Handbook of the State of Georgia, Atlanta, pp. 17–113.
Loebeck, A.K., 1941, Geologic map of the United States with text on the reverse side, Geographic Press, New York.
Maclure, W., 1809, Observations on the geology of the United States, explanatory of a geological map, American Philosophy Society Transactions, 6:411-428.
MacNeil, F.S., 1947, Geologic map of the Tertiary and Quaternary formations of Georgia, U.S. Geological Survey Oil and gas investigations Preliminary Map 72.
Marcou, J., 1853, Geological map of the United States and British Provinces of North America, with an explanatory text, Gould and Lincoln, Boston, 92 p.
McCallie, S.W., 1908, Preliminary report on the underground waters of Georgia, Georgia Geological Survey Bulletin 15, 370 p.
McCallie, S.W., and Veatch, J.O, 1909, Preliminary geological map of Georgia, Georgia Geological Survey Bulletin 18.
McCollum, M.J., 1966, Ground water resources and geology of Rockdale County, Georgia, Georgia Geological Survey Information Circular 33, 17 p.
McGee, W.J., 1884, Map of the United States exhibiting the present status of knowledge relating to the areal distribution of geologic groups, U.S. Geological Survey, description in U.S. Geological Survey Annual report 5, pp. 34–41.
Moxon, C., 1843, On the geology of the United States, Geologist, pp. 56–64.
Murray, J.B., 1973, Geologic map of Forsyth and north Fulton Counties, Georgia Geologic Survey Map RM-7, 1:63,360.
Nesbitt, R. T., 1895, Georgia – her resources and possibilities, Franklin Printing Co., Atlanta, 468 p.
O'Connor, Carpenter, Paris, Hartley, and Denman, 1974, Geological Society of America Abstract with Program, 6(4):
O'Connor, B.J., Lawton, D.E., and Moye, F.J., 1974, A "Brevard" quartzite-schist unit extending into the inner Piedmont of Georgia, Geological Society of America Abstract with Program, 6(4):383-384.
Pickering, S.M., Jr., 1970, Stratigraphy, paleontology, and economic geology of portions of Perry and Cochran Quadrangles, Georgia, Georgia Geological Survey Bulletin 81, 67 p.
Pickering, S.M., Jr., 1972, Minerals yearbook area reports, Domestic 1972, Bureau of Mines, pp. 189–204.
Pickering, S.M., Jr., 1976, Geologic Map of Georgia, Geologic Survey of Georgia.
Power, W. R., and Reade, E.H., Jr., 1962, The Georgia Marble district, Guidebook number 1, Southeast Section of the Geological Society of America, 21 p.
Rogers, H.D., 1856, Geological map of the United States and British North America, Plate VIII, in Johnston, A.K., Physical atlas of natural phenomena, Blackwood and Sons, London.
Salisbury, J.W., 1961, Geology and Mineral Resources of the northwest quarter of the Cohutta Mountain quadrangle,  Georgia Geological Survey Bulletin 71, 61 p.
Salotti, C.A., and Fouts, J.A., 1967, Specifications in ground water related to geologic formations in the Broad quadrangle, Georgia, Georgia Geological Survey Bulletin 78, 34 p.
Sandrock, G.S., and Penley, H.M., 1974, Geological Society of America Abstract with Program, 6(4):
Sever, C.W., 1964, Geology and ground water resources of crystalline rocks, Dawson County, Georgia, Georgia Geological Survey Information Circular 30, 32 p.
Stephenson, W.F., 1871, Geology and mineralogy of Georgia, Globe Publishing Co., Atlanta, GA, 244 p.
Stose, G.W.,  Smith, R W, and others, 1939, Geologic map of Georgia,  scale 1:500,000, Georgia Division of Mines, Mining, and geology, and the U.S. Geological Survey.
Torbert, J.B., and McGee, W.J., 1895, Geological map of the United States showing the distribution of Pleistocene ice-work and water work so far as known, in Johnson's Universal Cyclopaedia, vol. 3, p. 796, A.J. Johnson and co., New York.
White, G, 1849, Statistics of the State of Georgia, includes map by W.T. Williams on the Geologic features, Savannah, GA, 624 p.
Williams, W.T., 1849, Bonner's map of the State of Georgia with the addition of geological features, in White, G, Statistics of the State of Georgia, W.T. Williams, Savannah.
Willis, B., 1906, Carte geologique de l'Amerique du Nord, International Geological Congress, 10th, Mexico, Comptes Rendus, 1:211-225.
Zapp, A.D., and Clark, L.D., 1965, Bauxite in areas adjacent to and between the Springvale and Andersonville districts, Georgia, U.S. Geological Survey Bulletin 1199-H, pp. 1–10.

External links
Félix de Beaujour Collection, circa 1805-1810, Princeton University
USGS Georgia Geologic Mapping Program
Index and Short Description to the Geologic terms used by the GSS
USGS - The National Geologic Map Database
National Geologic Mapping Reauthorization Act of 2009
David Rumsey Historical Map Collection

Geology of Georgia (U.S. state)
Georgia (U.S. state) maps
Geologic maps